Events from the year 1941 in Denmark.

Incumbents
 Monarch – Christian X
 Prime minister – Thorvald Stauning

Events

Sports
 Frem wings their fifth Danish football championship by winning the 1940–41 Danish War Tournament.

Births
 8 January – Ole Søltoft, actor (died 1999)
 6 November – Grethe Fenger Møller, Danish politician
 28 November – Jesper Thilo, jazz saxophonist

Deaths
 14 March – Herluf Zahle, barrister with the Supreme Court, career diplomat, President of the League of Nations 1928–29 (born 1873)
 10 May – Gustav Bartholin Hagen, architect (born 1873)
 20 June – Peder Mørk Mønsted, painter (born 1859)
 25 July – Christian Sonne, politician (born 1859)
 30 August – Peder Oluf Pedersen, engineer and physicist, IEEE Medal of Honor recipient in 1930 (born 1874)
 3 November – Jens Christian Kofoed, architect (born 1864)
 26 November – Niels Hansen Jacobsen, sculptor (born 1861)

References

 
Denmark
Years of the 20th century in Denmark
1940s in Denmark
1941 in Europe